Groundnut may refer to:

 Seeds that ripen underground, of the following plants, all in the Faboideae subfamily of the legumes:
 Arachis hypogaea, the peanut
 Arachis villosulicarpa, a perennial peanut species
 Vigna subterranea, the Bambara groundnut
 Macrotyloma geocarpum, the Hausa groundnut
 Roots and tubers:
 Apios americana, the American groundnut or potato-bean
 Conopodium majus, called the kippernut among many other names
 Panax trifolius, or dwarf ginseng

See also
 Ground nuts, nuts subjected to grinding
 Earthnut (disambiguation)
 Tanganyika groundnut scheme